is an underground railway station in the city of Nagano, Japan, operated by the private railway operating company Nagano Electric Railway.

Lines
Gondō Station is a station on the Nagano Electric Railway Nagano Line and is 1.0 kilometers from the terminus of the line at Nagano Station and 32.2 km from the terminus at Yudanaka Station in Yamanouchi, Nagano.

Station layout
The station is an underground station consisting of two opposed side platforms serving two tracks. The station is staffed.

Platforms

Adjacent stations

History
The station opened on 28 June 1926. It was reopened as an underground station on 1 March 1981.

Passenger statistics
In fiscal 2016, the station was used by an average of 1305 passengers daily (boarding passengers only).

Surrounding area

 central Nagano city
 
 
 Head office of Nagano Electric Railway
 
 , a cinema which first opened as a kabuki theatre in 1892
 Gocho Campus of the University of Nagano

See also
 List of railway stations in Japan

References

External links

 

Railway stations in Japan opened in 1926
Railway stations in Nagano (city)
Nagano Electric Railway